Mesosa hirsuta is a species of beetle in the family Cerambycidae. It was described by Henry Walter Bates in 1884. It is known from Japan and China.

Subspecies
 Mesosa hirsuta albihirsuta Kusama & Takakuwa, 1984
 Mesosa hirsuta brevihirsuta Makihara, 1980
 Mesosa hirsuta continentalis Hayashi, 1964
 Mesosa hirsuta hirsuta Bates, 1884
 Mesosa hirsuta konishii Hayashi, 1965

References

hirsuta
Beetles described in 1884